Étienne de Molinier (1580-1650) was a French Christian theologian and thomist. He argued that painting was a metaphor for God's creation.

Works

References

1580 births
1650 deaths
Writers from Toulouse
17th-century French Catholic theologians
Thomists